M. Abdul Gafoor is a CITU Andhra Pradesh State Secretary, All India CITU Vice President and CPM Central Committee Member, Founder Awwaz State President. Twice he was elected MLA from Kurnool, 1994, 2004,  Member of the Legislative Assembly in Andhra Pradesh in the 1994 state assembly elections, winning the Kurnool constituency as a Communist Party of India (Marxist) candidate. He had unsuccessfully contested the seat in the 1989 elections. In the 2004 elections, he won the seat again, with T. G. Venkatesh of the Telugu Desam Party being his nearest rival. He lost to Venkatesh, who was now a candidate of the Indian National Congress, from the same constituency in the elections of 2009.

References 

Andhra Pradesh MLAs 2004–2009
Communist Party of India (Marxist) politicians from Andhra Pradesh
People from Kurnool
Andhra Pradesh MLAs 1994–1999
Living people
Year of birth missing (living people)